"Days" is a short poem (10 lines) by Philip Larkin, written in 1953 and included in his 1964 collection The Whitsun Weddings.

See also 
List of poems by Philip Larkin

References

External links 
 Full text of "Days" at the Poetry Foundation website

Poetry by Philip Larkin
1964 poems